Stones Corner busway station is located in Brisbane, Australia serving the suburb of Stones Corner. It opened on 29 August 2011, as part of the Eastern Busway from Buranda to Main Avenue, Coorparoo.

It is served by three routes all operated by Brisbane Transport.

References

External links
[ Stones Corner station] TransLink

Bus stations in Brisbane
Transport infrastructure completed in 2011